Gábor Pásztor (born 25 November 1982) is a Hungarian track and field athlete specialized in short-distance running events.

During his college years (2006) he signed with Ferencvárosi TC, later, in 2012 he was transferred to Központi Sportiskola, then back to FTC in 2014. In 2012 Pásztor moved to the United States and founded Athletic Club Miami, a City of Miami based sport organization.

Pásztor represented Hungary on several international competitions such as:
 2008 European Cup (athletics) First League, Istanbul (Turkey) , 200 m
 2009 European Team Championships First League, Bergen (Norway) , 200m
 2009 Summer Universiade, Belgrade (Serbia) 200m
 2010 European Team Championships First League, Budapest (Hungary) 200 m
 2010 European Athletics Championships – Men's 4 x 400 metres relay Barcelona (Spain) 
 2011 European Team Championships First League, Izmir (Turkey) , 200m
 2014 European Team Championships First League, Tallinn (Estonia) 200m, 
 2015 European Team Championships Second League, Stara Zagora, (Bulgaria) 400m, 
 2016 European Athletics Championships Amsterdam 2016, (Netherlands) 200m

National Achievements 

 2006 Hungarian Athletics Championships, Men's 200 m – Silver
 2007 Hungarian Athletics Championships, Men's  – Gold
 2008 Hungarian Athletics Championships, Men's 200 m – Gold
 2009 Hungarian Athletics Championships, Men's  – Gold
 2009 Hungarian Athletics Championships, Men's 200 m – Silver
 2010 Hungarian Athletics Championships, Men's 200 m – Gold
 2011 Hungarian Athletics Championships Men's 200 m – Silver

Source:

References 

1982 births
Living people
Hungarian male sprinters
Athletes from Budapest